Hapoel Ironi Marmorek Rehovot F.C., commonly known as Hapoel Marmorek, is an Israeli football club based in Rehovot. They are currently in Liga Alef South, the third level of Israeli football. Home matches are played at the Itztoni Stadium.

History
The club founded in 1949, and played by the early 1960s in Liga Bet, which by then was the third tier of Israeli football. in the 1962–63 season the club promoted to Liga Alef after finished third in Liga Bet South B.

In the summer of 1968, the club merged with fellow Rehovot club, Hapoel Rehovot, and the club became officially known since the merger as Hapoel Marmorek-Rehovot.

In the 1971–72 season, the club won the South Division of Liga Alef and promoted to the top flight of Israeli football, Liga Leumit, for the first time in their history. however, they finished bottom in their first season in the top flight, and were relegated back to Liga Alef.

The club played in Liga Alef until the 1975–76 season and finished only in the thirteenth place, which was not enough to secure a place in the newly formed Liga Artzit, thus, the club relegated to the new Liga Alef (now as third tier).

Marmorek won Liga Alef South in the 1977–78 season and promoted to Liga Artzit, then relegated back to Liga Alef in the following season. they promoted once more to Liga Artzit after winning Liga Alef South in the 1982–83 season, and remained further four seasons in Liga Artzit, up until the 1986–87 season where they finished eleventh and had to play in the relegation play-offs. they clinched only one single point in the play-offs, after they draw with Maccabi Hadera, and lost to Hapoel Ramat Gan and Hapoel Bat Yam. thus, they were relegated to Liga Alef.

In the 1990s, the club relegated to Liga Bet, and following the creation of the Israeli Premier League which saw all the lower divisions demoted in the football pyramid, the club found itself in the fifth tier of Israeli football, in which the club won in the 1999–2000 season, and promoted back to Liga Alef. in 2002–03, the club finished second in Liga Alef South, and promoted to Liga Artzit (now as third tier) as the best runner-up of Liga Alef, thus, they replaced Beitar Be'er Sheva, which were folded. the club continued to play in Liga Artzit until its final season, when they finished third, and secured a place in Liga Leumit for the following season, and by that, made a return to the second tier after 23 years. however, they finished bottom, winning only 2 matches out of 35, and relegated to Liga Alef, where they play today.

Stadium
The club plays at the Itztoni Stadium, which is named after former Marmorek player Tony Shar'abi. The stadium has a seated capacity of 1,500.

Current squad
 As of 1 January 2023

Honours

League

Cup competitions

References

External links
Fansite
Hapoel Marmorek Haim Rehovot  Israel Football Association 

 
Marmorek
Marmorek
Association football clubs established in 1949
1949 establishments in Israel
Sport in Rehovot